Nehemiah Hezekiah Earll (October 5, 1787 – August 26, 1872) was a 19th Century American lawyer and politician who served one term as a U.S. Representative from New York from 1839 to 1841.

He was a cousin of Congressman Jonas Earll, Jr..

Biography 
Born in Whitehall, New York, Earll moved with his parents to Onondaga Valley in 1793, but nine months later he moved to Onondaga County and resided in Skaneateles until 1804. He attended the public schools and Fairfield Academy for two years and studied law.

Early career 
He was admitted to the bar in 1809 and commenced practice in Salina (which in 1848 became a part of Syracuse), Onondaga County. During the War of 1812 he served as an adjutant in the Army at Oswego. After the war, he resumed the practice of law at Onondaga Hill, New York, in 1814.

He served as Postmaster of Onondaga Hill in 1816 and then was the Justice of the Peace in 1816–1820. He served as master in chancery for six years and was appointed the first judge of Onondaga County, serving from 1823 until his resignation in 1831. He served next as Superintendent of the Onondaga Salt Springs 1831–1836, when he resided in Syracuse, New York. He resigned, and engaged in the milling business in Jordan before returning to Syracuse, New York, in 1838.

Congress 
Earll was elected as a Democrat to the Twenty-sixth Congress (March 4, 1839 – March 3, 1841). He was an unsuccessful candidate for reelection in 1840 to the Twenty-seventh Congress.

Retirement and death 
He retired to private life, being blind for many years and died in Mottville, New York, August 26, 1872. He was interred in Oakwood Cemetery, Syracuse, New York.

References

1787 births
1872 deaths
People from Skaneateles, New York
People from Whitehall, New York
Politicians from Syracuse, New York
United States Army personnel of the War of 1812
Democratic Party members of the United States House of Representatives from New York (state)
19th-century American politicians
Burials at Oakwood Cemetery (Syracuse, New York)
Lawyers from Syracuse, New York
Military personnel from Syracuse, New York
United States Army officers
19th-century American lawyers